Preposterously Dank is the first self-released solo debut studio album by American rapper Spose, released on April 22, 2008. The album was released under Frothy Four Records (Spose's record label).

Production
The album was recorded at Small World in Wells, Maine. Eric Dahms produced 5 tracks on the album, while Spose produced 4, Grey Leaf and Jim Brown each produced 2. In 2010 the album was released through iTunes with two exclusive songs, "It's Alright With Me" "Preposterously Dank (Live At The Big Easy)".

Track listing

Credits
Mixed by: Eric Dahms, Jim Brown
Recorded by: Jim Brown 
Producer: Eric Dahms (tracks: 1, 2, 3, 5, 10), Grey Leaf (tracks: 6, 7), Jim Brown (tracks: 8, 11), Spose (tracks: 4, 5, 9, 10) 
Lyrics by: Spose

See also
2008 in music
Underground hip hop

References

2008 debut albums